The 2010 Auckland Rugby League season was the 2010 season of senior rugby league in Auckland. The Auckland Rugby League ran the various competitions. The season commenced on 13 March, with the start of the Phelan Shield, and finished on 28 August with the three senior grand finals. This was the 101st season of the competition, which began in 1910.

The season followed the same format as 2009, with a qualification series in the first half of the year giving sixteen teams the opportunity to enter the Fox Memorial competition.

Fox Memorial Qualification Series
The Appliance Shed Fox Memorial Qualification Series involved sixteen teams divided into two pools, with the top eight teams entering the Fox Memorial competition. It started on 20 March and concluded on 2 May. The bottom eight teams instead entered the Sharman Cup.

Teams
Papakura were coached by Dean Clark.
Otahuhu were coached by Richie Blackmore.
Mt Albert were coached by Steve Buckingham with Ben Lythe as his assistant coach. The team included Matthew Sturm.
East Coast Bays were coached by Willie Swann & Joe Vagana.
Te Atatu included former Warrior Malo Solomona.
The Bay Roskill Vikings were coached by Duane Mann and featured Willie Wolfgramm.

Standings

Phelan Shield

The Mandron Masonry Phelan Shield began on 13 March and featured eleven teams. The Manukau Magpies were the 2009 champions, but in 2010 they were promoted into the Fox Memorial Qualifying series at the expense of the Hibiscus Coast Raiders. The Pukekohe Pythons also replaced the Waiheke Rams.

After finishing last in 2009 the Point Chevalier Pirates received the help of old boys Awen Guttenbeil and Stacey Jones who were able to attract some high-profile players to the club such as Wairangi Koopu, Monty Betham and Karl Te Nana. They went on to win the minor premiership in their 90th season, losing only two games in the round robin, before beating the Otara Scorpions 37–12 in the grand final.

Sharman Cup
The bottom eight teams in the Fox Memorial Qualification Series took part in the SAS Sharman Cup. The Howick Hornets were the defending champions but in 2010 they earned a place in the Fox Memorial. The Cup was won by the minor premiers, the East Coast Bays Barracudas, who defeated the Bay Roskill Vikings 34–4.

Fox Memorial

The top eight teams in the Fox Memorial Qualification Series took part in the Appliance Shed Fox Memorial. The Mt Albert Lions were the defending champions. Round One began with the Otahuhu Leopards and Northcote Tigers playing off for the Stormont Shield and Roope Rooster Challenge Trophy. Otahuhu won this contest and also finished the season as minor premiers to claim to Rukutai Shield.

Otahuhu defeated Mt Albert 22–18 in the grand final to claim the Fox Memorial.

Auckland Rugby League Referees Association

The ARL Referees Association celebrated 100 years in 2010 after being founded on 24 May 1910. The referees wore a special centenary strip to celebrate the year.

High school
St. Paul's College won the University Cup as first XIII champions. Tamaki College won the under 85 kg division while St Paul's College won the Graeme Lowe Cup for Under 15's.

Awards

References

External links
Official Site

        
        
        
        
        

Auckland Rugby League seasons
Auck